The 1260s is the decade starting January 1, 1260 and ending December 31, 1269.

Significant people
 Berke Khan
 Kublai Khan
 Hulagu Khan
 Baibars
 Louis IX of France
 Qutuz

References